Fair Play (sometimes written as "Fairplay") is an unincorporated community in Panola County, in the U.S. state of Texas.

History
The first settlement at Fair Play was made in the 1840s. According to tradition, he community was so named on account of the fairness characterized by first settlers.

References

Unincorporated communities in Texas
Unincorporated communities in Panola County, Texas